New Cinema Tokage (New Cinema 蜥蜴) was a Japanese rock-band under Giza Studio label active in years 19972002. Their management office was Ading.

Members
Motoari Funaki (舩木基有) - vocalist and lyricist
Yuuichiro Iwai (岩井勇一郎) - composer and guitarist
Keisuke Kurumatani (車谷啓介) - drummer and lyricist
Hideki Kawagoe (川越英樹) - bassist in years 1998-2000
Hiroyuki Wakita (脇田啓行) - bassist in years 2000-2002

Biography
The formation of the band began in 1997, at this time Motoari and Yuuichiro were working on their demo tape. After Keisuke joined in summer 1998, the members came up with the name New Cinema Tokage. The origin of which comes from the Italian movie Cinema Paradiso which Seiichiro had watched.

In October 1998, under Giza Studio indies label, they released their first indies single 360° and debuted as the label's first artist.
By January 1999, they had released their first indies album Smashing the bad!.

In February 1999, in collaboration with artists Sweet Velvet and Grass Arcade, the band released the single Smashing the Good Smashing the Bad in double formats: 8 cm and 12 cm maxi-single. The single was used as an image song for PlayStation portable game Monster Rancher 2.
Following this, their second single Candy Life secured them their most successful position, 49, in Oricon Weekly charts. It was released on the same day as Rumania Montevideo's debut single Still for your love.

In September 1999, they released their first major studio album Rail. Two months after this, they held their first one-man live tour Rail: Senro wa Tsuzuku yo dokomademo. For April–May 2000 they held a national live tour. Soon after, Hideki left the band.

In June 2000, the open bassist position was filled by Hiroyuki, a former member of Grass Arcade.

Later, in October 2000, Keisuke and Yuuichiro became regular TV personalities of programs So-Hot and HP Kyoto.

In February 2001, their fanclub Hooligan was established.

In May 2001, their second and final studio album Many Elements and single "Free Bird" were released on the same day.
In August 2001, the single "Breath on me" become their last work which was included in Oricon Weekly charts. The single was used as an opening theme for Anime television series Project ARMS.
In December 2001, their single "Love Generation" was included in Giza Studio's compilation album Giza Studio Masterpiece Blend 2001.

Their final single, "Run", was released in February 2002 and, in August, the band announced its disband through their official website.

After the disband, Yuuichiro and Keisuke later become members of Giza Studio's Japanese pop-rock band U-ka Saegusa in dB which were active in years 2003–2010. Nowadays, Keisuke is a member of instrumental band Sensation. Yuuichiro's presence was unknown in 2010, however, in 2019 he makes regular appearances as a support guitarist in Sard Underground and Marie Ueda. In 2004, Hideki became a member of rock band ELF under Tent House label. Motoari formed solo unit Koora and for a short time in 2005 he was blogging on Japanese service Liverdoor.

Discography

Indies singles

Singles

Studio albums

Indies albums

Magazine appearances
From Music Freak Magazine:
Vol.51 1999/February
Vol.52 1999/March
Vol.53 1999/March
Vol.56 1999/July
Vol.57 1999/August
Vol.58 1999/September
Vol.59 1999/October
Vol.60 1999/November
Vol.61 1999/December
Vol.62 2000/January
Vol.64 2000/March
Vol.65 2000/April
Vol.70 2000/September
Vol.71 2000/October
Vol.72 2000/November
Vol.73 2000/December
Vol.74 2001/January
Vol.76 2001/March
Vol.78 2001/May
Vol.80 2001/July
Vol.81 2001/August
Vol.83 2001/October
Vol.86 2001/October
Vol.87 2001/October

From J-Rock Magazine:
1999/02
1999/03
1999/04
1999/06
1999/08
1999/10
1999/11
1999/12
2000/03
2000/04

From Digital Creators DGCR:
Vol.3
Vol.6
Vol.7
Vol.8
Vol.10
Vol.13

From J-Groove Magazine:
December 2000 Vol.2
February 2001 Vol.4
May 2001 Vol.7
June 2001 Vol.8
October 2001 Vol.12
April 2002 Vol.18

References

External links
Official website 
Official website by Being (in Japanese) 
Oricon profile (in Japanese)()
Musing profile (in Japanese)
Keisuke Kurumatani profile from official website of Sensation

Authority
Musicbrainz.org page 

Being Inc. artists
Living people
Japanese rock music groups
Anime musicians
Musical groups established in 1998
Musical groups disestablished in 2002
Year of birth missing (living people)